Rolling Green Run is a tributary of the Susquehanna River in Snyder County, Pennsylvania, in the United States. The stream is designated as an impaired waterbody due to habitat alteration from golf courses. Its drainage basin is designated as a Warmwater Fishery and a Migratory Fishery.

Course

Rolling Green Run begins in a small valley in Monroe Township. It flows west for a few tenths of a mile and enters a larger valley. Here, the stream turns south-southeast for several tenths of a mile before turning southeast. Several tenths of a mile further downstream, it leaves the valley, receives two unnamed tributaries (one from the left and one from the right), and enters the census-designated place of Hummels Wharf. In Hummels Wharf, the stream turns south-southeast for more than a mile before crossing US Route 11/US Route 15 and turning northeast. It flows parallel to the Susquehanna River for several tenths of a mile before reaching its confluence with the Susquehanna River.

Rolling Green Run joins the Susquehanna River .

Hydrology

The cause of the impairment is miscellaneous habitat alteration and the probable source is golf courses. Sunbury Generation LP is authorized to discharge bottom ash sluice water and stormwater into the stream until June 30, 2019.

Geography and geology

Rolling Green Run was historically a tributary of Penns Creek. In the 1970s, two 15-inch (38-centimeter) lines emptied into Rolling Green Run.

Watershed
The stream is entirely within the United States Geological Survey quadrangle of Sunbury. The designated use of the stream is aquatic life.

There are relative acute threats of localized flooding on Rolling Green Run.

History
Rolling Green Run was entered into the Geographic Names Information System on August 2, 1979. Its identifier in the Geographic Names Information System is 1185407.

A steel stringer/multi-beam or girder bridge carrying State Route 1017 over Rolling Green Run was constructed in 1954. In 2003, a project to add  of new four-lane, limited-access highway to US Route 15 was described as impacting the stream.

Biology
The drainage basin of Rolling Green Run is designated as a Warmwater Fishery and a Migratory Fishery. The stream is affected by catch and release regulations for bass.

See also
Sealholtz Run, next tributary of the Susquehanna River going downriver
Shamokin Creek, next tributary of the Susquehanna River going upriver
List of rivers of Pennsylvania

References

Rivers of Snyder County, Pennsylvania
Tributaries of the Susquehanna River
Rivers of Pennsylvania